Micrachne is a genus of flowering plants belonging to the family Poaceae.

Its native range is Tropical Africa to Botswana.

Species:

Micrachne fulva 
Micrachne obtusiflora 
Micrachne patentiflora 
Micrachne pilosa 
Micrachne simonii

References

Poaceae
Poaceae genera